Club Náutico (‘Nautical Club’) is a building in Cuba. 

History 
It was originally built in the 1920s and expanded in 1936 by its owner Carlos Fernández. Guests paid a modest fee (.10 cents), eventually there were more than five thousand subscribers. Fernández had in addition to the enjoyment of a short beach, a dance floor with an orchestra. By the 1950s, an increase in membership necessitated expansion  of the original premises in 1953 and Max Borges Recio designed a set of porticos covered by vaults similar to the ones he recently had designed for the Tropicana.

Architecture 
Borges used a catenary arch, similar to those used in the Tropicana.

There is a color differentiation at the Club Náutico between the blue, and smooth surface of the architectural covering of the arch and the white structure above. The arches at the Club Náutico lack the architectural and structural purity that Borges achieved at the Tropicana as most of the arches there are for the most part self-supporting. Here as in the Tropicana Borges used the difference in height between arches to insert a clear glass skylight. The floors are polished concrete.

References

External links
Club Náutico
El viejo Náutico
Vista de la Playa: el Náutico

 

Buildings and structures in Havana